Brachyglottis pentacopa is a species of flowering plant in the family Asteraceae. It is found only in New Zealand.

References

pentacopa
Flora of New Zealand
Endangered flora of New Zealand
Vulnerable plants
Taxonomy articles created by Polbot
Endemic flora of New Zealand